Jim Hogg County Independent School District is a public school district based in Hebbronville, Texas (USA). The district boundaries parallel those of Jim Hogg County.

In 2009, the school district was rated "academically acceptable" by the Texas Education Agency.

Schools
Hebbronville High School (Grades 9-12)
Hebbronville Junior High (Grades 6-8)
Hebbronville Elementary (Grades PK-5)

References

External links
 

School districts in Jim Hogg County, Texas